The Harvard-Yale chess match is held annually around the time of the Harvard-Yale football game in November on the campus of the university hosting the football game that year. The tradition dates as far back as the year 1900. It is a relatively informal match and the schools do not typically submit the games to the United States Chess Federation for rating. Nevertheless, it is one of the highlights of the year for each school's chess club. The match typically consists of five games (sometimes four), pitting five current Harvard students against five current Yale students (undergraduate or graduate), with the boards numbered 1 through 5 (with 1 having the strongest players and 5 having the weakest). The team with the most game points is declared the winner of the match, with a win worth 1 point, a draw worth half a point, and a loss worth 0 points. In the case of a tie, either the match is declared a tie, or a tie-breaking procedure is applied. Tie-breaking procedures applied in the past included using the result of the strongest non-drawing board as the result of the match, or using results achieved on boards numbered higher than 5 by players from each school who were not selected to be in the top five. Match details vary each year depending on the preferences of current members of each school's chess club.

Those who play in the match are typically strong tournament players. The ratings range from around 1800 to 2400 USCF. Players occasionally are FIDE International Masters or grandmasters.

As of 2022, the champion is Yale, after defeating Harvard 2.5-1.5.

Results

Lineups

2011 

Harvard: Jake Miller, Bram Louis, Josh Bakker, Naor Brown, Tony Blum

Yale: Robert Hess, Bogdan Vioreanu, Patrick O’Keefe, Adam Weser, Gordon Moseley

2008 

Yale: Bogdan Vioreanu, Kurt Schneider, Pasha Kamyshev, Gordon Moseley, Rahil Esmail

2005 

Yale: David Wang, Matthew Traldi, Pavel Kamyshev, Scott Caplan, David Lyons

2004 

Harvard: Geoffrey Gelman, Daniel H. Thomas, Arin Madenci, Annie Weiss
 
Yale: Akira Watanabe, Matthew Traldi, Haoyuan Wang, Scott Caplan

2001 

Harvard: Daniel H. Thomas, Marc R. Esserman, Victor M. Lee, Yue Wu, Lu Yin, Jason Rihel, Noam Elkies

2000 

Harvard: Yakov Chudnovsky, Jonathan A. Wolff, Charles R. Riordan, Lu Yin

Notable players who have competed in the match

FIDE Grandmasters
Nicolas Checa (Yale, 2021, 2022)
Darwin Yang (Harvard: 2016)
Robert Hess (Yale: 2011, 2012, 2013, 2014)
Patrick Wolff (Yale, Harvard, GM title earned in 1990)
Joel Benjamin (Yale, GM title earned in 1986)

FIDE International Masters
Richard Wang (Harvard: 2016)
Matthew Larson (Yale: 2015, IM title earned in 2018)
Bogdan Vioreanu (Yale: 2008, 2009, 2010, 2011)
Marc Esserman (Harvard: 2001, IM title earned in 2009)
Teddy Coleman (Harvard: 2008, 2009, 2010, IM title earned in 2012)

Other
Kurt Hugo Schneider (Yale: 2006, 2008, 2009)

Games
2009, Board 1, Coleman (H) vs. Vioreanu (Y)
2010, Board 1, Coleman (H) vs. Vioreanu (Y)

References

Chess competitions
Chess in the United States
Student sports competitions